Martin James Browning (born 1946) is Professor of Economics at the University of Oxford, Oxford, England, a Fellow of Nuffield College, Oxford, a Fellow of the Econometric Society, and an emeritus Fellow of the European Economic Association.

Education 
Browning received his undergraduate education at the London School of Economics and his doctorate from Tilburg University.

Career 
He was previously the Director of the Center for Applied Microeconometrics at the University of Copenhagen, Denmark. Before the appointment at University of Copenhagen, he was a professor at McMaster University, Canada.

Research 
His work is in microeconomic analysis, with emphasis in the empirical assessments of theoretical propositions. He has worked in the areas of intrahousehold decision making; demand analysis; consumption and saving, and its interaction with labor supply. An important part of his work concerns the empirical assessment of rationality through the concept of revealed preference, and the modeling of individual heterogeneity in applied work.

Selected journal articles

References

External links
 Personal homepage

Alumni of the London School of Economics
Microeconomists
Tilburg University alumni
English economists
Fellows of the Econometric Society
Fellows of Nuffield College, Oxford
Academic staff of the University of Copenhagen
1946 births
Living people